The Quinpool District refers to a commercial district of Halifax, Nova Scotia, encompassing the eastern portion of Quinpool Road as well as the streets directly north and south of it. Prominent landmarks on Quinpool Road include the Atlantica Hotel, the Oxford Theatre, and an eclectic variety of local businesses, including many popular Chinese and Greek restaurants.

Quinpool Road runs from the Armdale Rotary through Connaught Avenue, terminating at what is known as the Willow Tree, on Robie Street - an unusual five-way intersection named for the prominent tree that once grew in the median. The street is commercialised from Connaught Ave to the Willow Tree and comprises a popular shopping and dining centre for the local community. It is also part of the Nova Scotia provincial road system, meaning that the Province of Nova Scotia pays the Halifax Regional Municipality in part for snow clearing and maintenance.

While the street is an important commercial district in Halifax, it also forms a major boundary between the city's working class North End and wealthier South End, both physically and socially. Quinpool is also the heart of the city's middle class West End neighbourhood. The area was also home to two longtime rival high schools, Queen Elizabeth High School and St. Patrick's High School until their merger as Citadel High School in September 2007.  St. Patrick's High School was since renamed the Quinpool Education Centre, and hosted a number of educational programs and social services. The city declared the school building surplus and it was demolished.

The name Quinpool dates from at least 1808 and is believed to come from an Irish widow named Quinn who lived by a stretch of water in the Northwest Arm known as 'Quinn's Pool'.

Notable places

 Deadman's Island Park
 Oxford Theatre (closed; converted into commercial use)
 East Coast Bakery ("Bagel Bagel Bagel")
 ProSkates
 Dilly Dally Cafe
 Ben's Bakery (closed, some buildings demolished)
 Quinpool Centre
 The Trail Shop (50+ year old outdoor store)
 The Other Bean
 Saint Patrick's High School (demolished)
 Atlantica Hotel
 Queen Elizabeth High School (demolished)
 Ardmore Tea Room
 Shaar Shalom Synagogue

See also
 Life – a 1968 sculpture on Quinpool Road

References

External links
Official website

Communities in Halifax, Nova Scotia
Roads in Halifax, Nova Scotia